Besham (Urdu, ; also known as Besham Qila) is a city in the Shangla District of Khyber Pakhtunkhwa, Pakistan. Located on the right bank of the Indus River (locally known as Abasin), Besham serves as a major junction on the Karakoram Highway, that connects Khyber Pakhtunkhwa and Punjab with Gilgit-Baltistan, and crosses over into China's Xinjiang. Besham is also the eastern terminus of the under-construction E90 expressway, which will connect the city westward with Khwazakhela in Swat District.

Historically, the place has been home to many Buddhist hermits, as well as a Hindu community. Besham was previously a part of the State of Swat and then Swat District, until the creation of Shangla District on 10 July 1995.

Tourism
Tourists pass through Besham if they are taking Karakoram Highway route for Hunza and Gilgit, as the alternative route through the Kaghan Valley is often blocked due to heavy snowfall. A rest house, located on the bank of the Indus River, is provided by the Pakistan Tourism Development Corporation.

Climate
With a mild and generally warm and temperate climate, Besham features a humid subtropical climate (Cfa) under the Köppen climate classification. The average temperature in Besham is 20.7 °C, while the annual precipitation averages 842 mm. Even in the driest months, there is a lot of precipitation. November is the driest month with 18 mm of precipitation, while August, the wettest month, has an average precipitation of 138 mm.

June is the hottest month of the year with an average temperature of 30.6 °C. The coldest month January has an average temperature of 8.9 °C.

References

Cities and towns in Shangla District